Saturation, saturated, unsaturation or unsaturated may refer to:

Chemistry
 Saturation, a chemical property of organic compounds which have only carbon-carbon single bonds
Saturated and unsaturated compounds
Degree of unsaturation
Saturated fat or fatty acid
Unsaturated fat or fatty acid
 Non-susceptibility of an organometallic compound to oxidative addition
 Saturation of protein binding sites
 Saturation of enzymes with a substrate
 Saturation of a solute in a solution, as related to the solute's maximum solubility at equilibrium
 Supersaturation, where the concentration of a solute exceeds its maximum solubility at equilibrium
 Undersaturation, where the concentration of a solute is less than its maximum solubility at equilibrium

Biology
 Oxygen saturation, a clinical measure of the amount of oxygen in a patient's blood
 Saturation pollination, a pollination technique
 Saturated mutagenesis, a form of site-directed mutagenesis
 Saturation (genetic), the observed number of mutations relative to the maximum amount possible
 Ocean saturation, more than 2.3 billion years ago: see "Great Oxygenation Event"
 Environmental saturation, environmental resistance to population growth: see "Logistic function" and "Carrying capacity"

Physics
 Colorfulness § Saturation, see also: "Saturation intent", a rendering intent in color management
 Thermodynamic state at lower temperature bound of superheated steam
 Saturation (magnetic), the state when a magnetic material is fully magnetized
 Saturated fluid or saturated vapor, contains as much thermal energy as it can without boiling or condensing
 Saturated steam
 Dew point, which is a temperature that occurs when atmospheric relative humidity reaches 100% and the air is saturated with moisture
 Saturated absorption, a set-up that enables the precise determination of the transition frequency of an atom between its ground state and an optically excited state

Electronics
 Saturation velocity, the maximum velocity charge carrier in a semiconductor attains in the presence of very high electric fields
 Saturation, a region of operation of a 
 Saturation current, limit of flowing current through a device

Hydrology
 Saturated zone, below the groundwater table
 Unsaturated zone, above the groundwater table
 Soil saturation, water content in a soil

Mathematics
 Saturation (commutative algebra), the inverse image of the localization of an ideal or submodule
 Saturated model, a concept in mathematical logic
 Saturation arithmetic, in arithmetic, a version of arithmetic in which all operations are limited to fixed range
 Saturation (graph theory), a categorization of vertices in graph theory
 Saturated measure, if every locally measurable set is also measurable
 Saturated multiplicatively closed sets, a concept in ring theory

Music
 "Saturation (song)", a 1997 single by Australian group The Superjesus
 Saturation (Urge Overkill album), 1993
 Saturation (Vas Deferens Organization album), 1996
 Saturation (Brockhampton album), 2017 (Also see Saturation II and Saturation III)

Other uses
 Market saturation, in economics
 Saturation diving

See also
 Saturate (disambiguation)
 Saturation point (disambiguation)